Sandwich Glass Museum is a glass museum in Sandwich, Massachusetts, featuring a wide range of rare glass, including glass from the local Boston & Sandwich Glass Factory which was founded in Sandwich by Deming Jarves in 1825. The Sandwich glass works primarily manufactured pressed lead-based glass, and was known for its use of color. The museum also has a live glass blower, and exhibits detailing the creation and coloring of various types of rare glass.

It has a furnace for clear glass heated to 2200 deg F that it runs 24x7 that shuts down only five years, and a computerized annealing oven to slowly cool down over a full day any new creations to help prevent cracking.

The live demo has variety of what's being created depending on time of year and nearby holidays, includes glass-blowing, shaping, mold-forming and adding bits of glass color, and the museum also has a historical movie that plays once per hour, and otherwise is a series of galleries each focused on a time period or glass creation techniques.

There is a shop at the end featuring consignment and museum-created items.

References

External
Sandwich Glass Museum

Museums in Barnstable County, Massachusetts
Art museums and galleries in Massachusetts
Glass museums and galleries in the United States
Buildings and structures in Sandwich, Massachusetts